Tengku Muhammad Fakhry Petra ibni Almarhum Sultan Ismail Petra (born 7 April 1978) is a member of the Kelantan Royal Family, who is the Tengku Bendahara of Kelantan and second in line of succession to the Kelantan throne. He is the younger brother of the current Sultan of Kelantan, Sultan Muhammad V.

Early life and education 
Tengku Fakhry was born in Kota Bharu, Kelantan on 7 April 1978 as the third of four children of the 28th Sultan of Kelantan, Sultan Ismail Petra and Raja Perempuan Tengku Anis. His two elder brothers are Sultan Muhammad V, the current Sultan of Kelantan and the 15th Yang di-Pertuan Agong of Malaysia, and Tengku Muhammad Faiz Petra, the Tengku Mahkota of Kelantan. His youngest sister is Tengku Amalin A’ishah Putri, the Tengku Maharani Putri.

Tengku Fakhry began his early education at Sultan Ismail Primary School (1) in Kota Bharu, Kelantan. He continued his studies at United World College in Singapore and then studied A-Levels at Hurtwood House in England. He graduated with a Bachelor's degree in Finance from the University of Westminster, London.

Personal life 
Tengku Fakhry married Manohara Odelia Pinot, an Indonesian model on 26 August 2008 in Kota Bharu, Kelantan. They met in December 2006 at a dinner held by the Deputy Prime Minister of Malaysia at time, Najib Razak. Manohara filed for divorce in May 2009, alleging that she had been endured physical and mental abuse from her husband. Tengku Fakhry denied these claims and his lawyer alleged that she was "out of spite" and "motivated by a desire of financial gains". The scandal received widespread media attention of interests.

Titles and honours

Titles 
Tengku Fakhry was earlier conferred the title of Tengku Temenggong of Kelantan in March 1997 by his father, Sultan Ismail Petra but the title was stripped by his brother, Sultan Muhammad V in September 2010. In April 2022, Tengku Fakhry was conferred the title of Tengku Bendahara of Kelantan by his brother, Sultan Muhammad V.

Honours 
  Recipient of the Royal Family Order of Kelantan or Star of Yunus (DK) (revoked 2010 and reinstated 2019)
  (revoked 2010)''

Note: * Both awards were rescinded in 2010. DK was reinstated some time in 2019. Status of the SPMK award is unknown.

Ancestry

References 

People from Kota Bharu
People from Kelantan
1978 births
Living people
Royal House of Kelantan
Malaysian Muslims
Malaysian people of Malay descent
Sons of monarchs